Lepista semiochracea is a moth of the  subfamily Arctiinae. It was described by Felder in 1874. It is found in South Africa.

References

 Natural History Museum Lepidoptera generic names catalog

Endemic moths of South Africa
Lithosiini
Moths described in 1874